Pietro Menzi (died 1504) was a Roman Catholic prelate who served as Bishop of Cesena (1487–1504).

Biography
On 11 May 1487, Pietro Menzi was appointed Bishop of Cesena by Pope Innocent VIII.

He served as Bishop of Cesena until his death in 1504.

References 

15th-century Italian Roman Catholic bishops
16th-century Italian Roman Catholic bishops
Bishops appointed by Pope Innocent VIII
Year of birth missing
1504 deaths